The Entertainment Technology Center (ETC) is a department at Carnegie Mellon University in Pittsburgh, Pennsylvania, United States. It is located at the Pittsburgh Technology Center.

The ETC offers a two-year Masters of Entertainment Technology (MET) degree, jointly conferred by Carnegie Mellon University's College of Fine Arts and School of Computer Science. Students enrolled in the ETC learn interdisciplinary skills in design, art and technology, and are prepared for environments where artists and technologists work hand-in-hand, such as theme parks, interactive museum exhibits, website design and development, and the creation of video games.

History
The ETC was co-founded by Donald Marinelli, a Professor of Drama, and Randy Pausch, a Professor of Computer Science, in 1999. The ETC has a history of having agreements with certain companies, such as Electronic Arts, Activision, and Rockstar Games, where the companies agree to hire a set number of ETC graduates each year.

Curriculum
The ETC's curriculum is split into 4 semesters, with a required industry internship in between the second and third semesters. The first semester includes required classes, such as Building Virtual Worlds, Fundamentals of Entertainment Technology, Improvisational Acting, and a Visual Storytelling class. The next three semesters all consist of a semester-long project course, and one elective class, which can be any other class taught at Carnegie Mellon University. The project course consists of 5 team-based projects, each of which is completed with a scrambled team of students, and in a two-week period.

Faculty
 Don Marinelli
 Drew Davidson
 Brenda Bakker Harger
 Mike Christel
 Ruth Comley
 John Dessler
 Chris Klug
 Jiyoung Lee
 Michelle Macau
 Carl Rosendahl
 Shirley Saldamarco
 Jesse Schell
 David Culyba
 Scott Stevens
 Jessica Trybus
 Ralph Vituccio

Adjunct Faculty
 John Buchanan
 Mk Haley
 David Gurwin
 Kerry Handron
 Jessica Hodgins
 Eric Paulos
 Luis Von Ahn
 William J (Chip) Walter
 John Wesner
 Josh Yelon

Staff
 Steve Audia
 MaryCatherine Dieterle
 Rebecca Lombardi
 Bryan Maher
 Cari Marty
 Julie McKenzie
 Janice Metz
 Vicki Poklemba
 David Purta
 Valerie Sofranko
 Susan Timko
 Jon Underwood
 Caitlin Zunic

Corporate partners
 Maiy El-Wakil
 Craig Lipchin
 Shawn Walters

Visiting scholars
 Anthony Daniels
 Nick Fortugno
 Michael Keaton
 Oscar Garcia Panella
 Mickey McManus
 Katie Salen

In memoriam
 Anne Humphreys
 Randy Pausch

References

External links
 

Educational institutions established in 1999
Schools and departments of Carnegie Mellon
1999 establishments in Pennsylvania